Ravindra Pratap Singh (7 July 1938) was an Indian politician associated with Jana Sangh, Janata Party, and BJP. He was elected to the Lok Sabha, lower house of the Parliament of India from Amethi, Uttar Pradesh defeating Sanjay Gandhi in the 1977 Indian general election as member of the Janata Party.

Personal life
Singh was born on 7 July 1938 to Naresh Bahadur Singh at Vijayi Mau village, Kunda Tehsil, Pratapgarh district. He got his primary education from Gandhi Higher Secondary School, Sangipur, Pratapgarh. He received his Bachelor of Commerce and LLB degrees from Udai Pratap Autonomous College in Varanasi. Singh married Nirmala Devi in February 1952, with whom he had three sons and three daughters. By profession he was a lawyer and agriculturist.

Positions held
Various positions held by Singh.
 District Vice-president, Jan Sangh 
 District Joint Secretary, Jan Sangh 
 District Secretary, Jan Sangh
 Secretary, Ranbir Ranjay Degree College, Amethi 
 Sultanpur, chairman, Shri Naresh Bahadur Junior Higher Secondary School, Kohra, Amethi
 Samyukta Sevak, Bharat Sevak Samaj
 Member, Uttar Pradesh Legislative Assembly, 1967 to 1969

References

External links
Official biographical sketch in Parliament of India website

1938 births
Living people
India MPs 1977–1979
Lok Sabha members from Uttar Pradesh
Janata Party politicians
Bharatiya Jana Sangh politicians
Bharatiya Janata Party politicians from Uttar Pradesh